Gargett is a rural locality in the Mackay Region, Queensland, Australia. In the  Gargett had a population of 261 people.

Geography 

History 
The locality takes its name from the Gargett railway station, which in turn was named (but misspelled) after John Garget, a railway construction contractor.

Barker's Creek Provisional School opened on 16 September 1895. On 1 January 1909 it became Barker's Creek State School. It closed in 1954.

The railway from Paget reached Gargett in 1902. It was a busy station during the sugar crushing season. Gargett Post Office opened by October 1910 (a receiving office had been open from 1909).

Gargett State School opened on 20 August 1914. The school celebrated its 100th anniversary on 20 August 2014.

In the  Gargett had a population of 261 people.

Education 
Gargett State School is a government primary (Prep-6) school for boys and girls at Tom Lynch Street. In 2018, the school had an enrolment of 25 students with 3 teachers (1 full-time equivalent) and 4 non-teaching staff (2 full-time equivalent).

Amenities 
The Mackay Regional Council operates a mobile library service on a fortnightly schedule at Mackay-Eungella Road.

The Gargett branch of the Queensland Country Women's Association meets at the QCWA Hall in Jim Moule Street.

References

Towns in Queensland
Mackay Region
Localities in Queensland